Gobiopsis macrostoma, the longjaw goby, is a species of goby found in the Indo-West Pacific from western India to the Mekong River.

Size

References

Gobiidae
Taxa named by Franz Steindachner
Fish described in 1861